The Most Rev. Mons. José María Gil Tamayo is an clergyman, diocesan priest, prelate, theologian, and philosopher of the Catholic Church in Spain who has been appointed as the Metropolitan Archbishop of Granada.

Biography 
Since 20 November 2013 he has served as general secretary of the same Conference. He was appointed bishop of Ávila on 6 November 2018 and received episcopal consecration on the following 15 December. 
In July 2022 Pope Francis appointed him as coadjutor archbishop of Granada.
On 1 February 2023 he appointed as Metropolitan Archbishop of Granada.

References

1957 births
Living people